Van P. Carey is an American mechanical engineer.

He held the A. Richard Newton Chair in Engineering at the University of California, Berkeley. In 2014, the American Institute of Aeronautics and Astronautics awarded Carey its Thermophysics Award.

References

Year of birth missing (living people)
Living people
20th-century American engineers
21st-century American engineers
American mechanical engineers
University of California, Berkeley faculty